The Juruá red howler (Alouatta juara) is a species of howler monkey, native to  Peru and Brazil.

References

Juruá red howler
Mammals of Brazil
Mammals of Peru
Howler monkeys of South America
Juruá red howler
Taxa named by Daniel Giraud Elliot